Taggart is a 1964 American Western film directed by R. G. Springsteen and starring Tony Young and Dan Duryea. It was the film debut of David Carradine.

Plot
Just arriving at their newly bought land, Kent Taggart's family has their cattle stampeded and they are murdered by Ben Blazer and his son. Blazer results seriously wounded. Later in a fair gunfight Kent kills Blazer's son. With his last breath, Blazer sends three gunfighters to find and kill Kent: Vince August, Cal Dodge, and Jay Jason, who is a particularly talkative and vicious killer.

In his escape, Taggart heads towards territory that has fallen in Apache hands, followed by the gunfighters. In a semiabandoned town, Taggart helps a lady in trouble at a saloon, getting in return her help and the bartender's. Caught by the gunfighters, he manages to kill Cal and flee.

Later, he finds a couple who are fighting with Apaches. Taggart joins them, and also the gunfighters do. Vince results wounded, and Jay disarms Taggart. The couple helps him to escape.

With no horse or gun, Taggart hides in a rocky hill, where he gets caught by an old man, Adam Stark, and his daughter Miriam. They take him to their dwelling, where there is another young woman, Adam's wife Consuela.

They treat him as a dangerous prisoner, but later that night, Consuela visits him and makes unequivocal advances, promising Taggart riches and happiness if he takes her away from that place. They are surprised by Miriam, who stops the offering and the women have an angry exchange, but as has happened before, Miriam won't tell her father what his wife is doing.

The next day, when Taggart is escaping, he saves Stark's life from an Apache attack. Stark changes his mind about him, and shows Taggart the reason why they haven't left: a gold mine in the property. Stark fills a couple of bags with gold rocks and prepares to leave, before the next Apache attack.

Meanwhile, Jay has killed Vince because he had become a hindrance, so he arrives alone at the Stark place. Taggart explains he is a hired killer, and Jay explains he is pursuing a murderer. The Starks favor Taggart over Jay.

Later that night, Consuela visits Jay and makes unequivocal advances, promising him riches and happiness if he takes her away from that place. Jay is happy to oblige. Another Apache attack happens and Stark results wounded. Jay and Consuela escape with the gold; the Starks head to a fort, with Taggart ahead as a scout.

Jay and Consuela meet a cavalrymen supplies convoy and join them for protection. While they are traveling in one of the Cavalry wagons, Consuela tells Jay she has changed her mind and wants to leave him. Jay attacks her, leaves her for dead, gets the gold, horses, and manages to escape moments before the Apache surround and destroy the Cavalry convoy.

Jay arrives at the fort and asks for new horses to keep running. The officer in command asks whether he has seen the reinforcements they are expecting, Jay says he hasn't seen anything but the destroyed convoy. The officer orders Jay to stay and fight. Taggart pass by the rests of the convoy, reunites with the Starks, and later they arrive at the same fort.

And so, Taggart, the Starks and the soldiers must defend themselves from a fierce Apache attack while hoping for the reinforcements and Jay is trying to escape with the gold before Taggart sees him.

Cast
 Tony Young as Kent Taggart
 Dan Duryea as Jay Jason
 Dick Foran as Adam Stark
 Elsa Cárdenas as Consuela Stark 
 Jean Hale as Miriam Stark
 Emile Meyer as Ben Blazer
 Tom Reese as Vince August
 David Carradine as Cal Dodge
 Peter Duryea as Rusty Bob Blazer  
 Ray Teal as Ralph Taggart 
 Claudia Barrett as Lola Manners 
 Stuart Randall as Sheriff
 Peter Mamakos as Cantina owner
 Arthur Space as Colonel
 Bill McLean as Doctor

See also
 List of American films of 1964

External links

1964 films
1964 Western (genre) films
Universal Pictures films
Films based on American novels
Films based on Western (genre) novels
Films directed by R. G. Springsteen
Films scored by Herman Stein
American Western (genre) films
1960s English-language films
1960s American films